The Fermor, later Eversfield Baronetcy, of Welches in the County of Suffolk and of Sevenoak in the County of Kent, was a title in the Baronetage of Great Britain. It was created on 4 May 1725 for Henry Fermor, of Castwisell House, Biddenden. Sir Henry died without a direct heir in 1734. He left funds to endow a local school that still bears his name.

The title was remaindered to Charles Eversfield, of Denne Park, near Horsham, West Sussex. He was succeeded according to the special remainder by the aforementioned Charles Eversfield, the second Baronet. He was the son of Charles Eversfield, Member of Parliament for Horsham. The title became extinct on his death in 1784.

On the landing in Horsham Museum hang works of art from the Museum's extensive painting collection, featuring a large eighteenth-century portrait of Charles Eversfield and his wife of Denne Park House. In the painting Eversfield is giving his wife some violets which signifies fidelity, love and honesty. It is likely that the picture was cut down at some time as it was unusual to stop just below the knee. The picture remained at Denne House until the last of the Eversfields died out and the house was sold off for flats just after World War II. The picture was bought following a fund raising campaign in 1948. It may have been painted by more than one person: someone who specialised in clothing, another in drapes, and so on, with perhaps the great court painter Sir Godfrey Kneller painting the heads, for it was the portraits that gave the sitters their identity, everything else is rather formulaic. There is nothing in the background to identify it as Denne House, so the picture was probably painted in a London studio rather than the artist travelling to Horsham.

The Eversfield family made their money through the Wealden iron industry and had moved to Denne Park, on the outskirts of Horsham, in 1604, paying £5,500 for the old property and rebuilding the house which still stands today. While very wealthy, they don't seem to have involved themselves in town life until the early eighteenth century when Charles Eversfield decided to stand as MP for Horsham. Thanks to political corruption, then the standard practice, he became MP aged 21 in 1705, and remained as one of two MPs for the town for the next 36 years. The corruption gave the town its new market house, built out of Portland stone, in 1723.

Fermor, later Eversfield baronets, of Welches and Sevenoak (1725)

Sir Henry Fermor, 1st Baronet (died 1734)
Sir Charles Eversfield, 2nd Baronet (–1784)

References

Horsham Museum

Extinct baronetcies in the Baronetage of Great Britain
Baronetcies created with special remainders